The National Produce Stakes is a greyhound racing competition held annually at Clonmel Greyhound Stadium in Clonmel, County Tipperary, Ireland.

Race History
It is a competition in the Irish racing greyhound racing calendar and was inaugurated in 1939. The event was held at Thurles Greyhound Stadium from 1999 to 2002.

Past winners

Venues and Distances
1939–1988 (Clonmel 525y) 
1999–2002 (Thurles 525y) 
2003–present (Clonmel 525y)

Sponsors
2003–2005 (Irish Stud Dog Owners & Red Mills)
2006–2013 (Connolly's Red Mills)
2014–2017 (Bank of Ireland Finance)
2018–present (Larry O'Rourke)

References

Greyhound racing competitions in Ireland
Recurring sporting events established in 1939
1939 establishments in Ireland
Sport in County Tipperary